Steve Stanton (born 1956) is a Canadian author, editor, and publisher.

Steve Stanton may also refer to:
Susan Stanton (born 1959), city manager, born Steven Stanton
Stephen Stanton (born 1961), American voice actor